Throbbin' '84 is a various artists "hits" compilation album released in Australia in 1984 on the Polygram record label. The album spent 5 weeks at the top of the Australian album charts in 1984.

Track listing
Side 1:
"Girls Just Want to Have Fun" - Cyndi Lauper
"Blue Day" - Mi-Sex
"Talking in Your Sleep" - The Romantics
"Cum On Feel the Noize" - Quiet Riot
"Just Be Good to Me" - The S.O.S. Band
"Break My Stride" - Matthew Wilder
"Calling Your Name" - Marilyn
"Kiss the Bride" - Elton John
"Sticky Music" - Sandii & the Sunsetz

Side 2:
"Jump" - Van Halen
"Beast of Burden" - Bette Midler
"All Night Long (All Night)" - Lionel Richie
"In a Big Country" - Big Country
"The Lovecats" - The Cure
"Original Sin" - INXS
"Love of the Common People" - Paul Young
"Come Said the Boy" - Mondo Rock
"Thriller" - Michael Jackson

Charts

References

1984 compilation albums
Pop compilation albums